Mixbury is a village and civil parish in Oxfordshire, about  southeast of Brackley in Northamptonshire.

Manor
The toponym is derived from the Old English mixen-burgh, meaning "fortification near dung-heap". "Burgh" refers to Beaumont Castle, which was built about 1100. It no longer stands, but its earthworks remain at the north end of the village.

The Domesday Book records that in 1086 Roger d'Ivry held a manor of 17 hides at Missberie. The manor was part of the Honour of St. Valery by 1213, when Robert de St. Valery gave Mixbury's mesne lordship to the Augustinian Osney Abbey. The abbey retained Mixbury until it was suppressed in the Dissolution of the monasteries in 1539.

Parish church
The Church of England parish church of All Saints dates from the 12th century. The south doorway is Norman, dating from about 1170. Early in the 14th century all the windows were replaced with Decorated Gothic ones. A south aisle of three bays and a west tower were added at the same time. The Perpendicular Gothic clerestory was added later. The chancel was restored in 1843 and the remainder of the church was restored after 1848. All Saints' is a Grade II* listed building.

The west tower has three bells. The treble bell was cast in 1577 by John Appowell of Buckingham, the tenor in 1609 by Robert Atton of Buckingham and the second in 1627 by Bartholomew Atton of Buckingham. Ringing now is very restricted for safety reasons. The church clock is of unknown date, but appears to be late 17th century.

The ecclesiastical parish is now a member of the Shelswell Benefice.

Economic and social history
An open field system of farming prevailed in the parish until 1730. Evidence suggests that it may have begun with two fields, but by the latter part of the 17th century it had been reorganised as a more efficient three-field system. The fields were Middle Field, Sandfield and West Field. Mixbury's inclosure act was passed in 1729 and the inclosure award was made the next year. This is by far the earliest inclosure act for an Oxfordshire parish: the next was not passed until 1758.

The main road between Buckingham and Banbury passes through the parish south of the village. It was made into a turnpike by an Act of Parliament in 1744.

The rector had the village school built in 1838. In 1928 it was reorganised as a junior school and older pupils were transferred to the school at Fringford. It was reorganised as an infants' school in 1948 and closed in 1955.

The original village consisted of thatch-roofed rubblestone cottages clustered between All Saints and the stream. In 1874 they were demolished under an order of the Court of Chancery and replaced with two rows of brick-faced semi-detached estate cottages laid out as a model village along the road leading south from the church.

Railways

Buckingham already had a railway station on the Buckinghamshire Railway, and was almost  from the Great Central station, so the name was later shortened to the more appropriate "Finmere".

In 1961 British Railways closed Fulwell and Westbury station to passenger traffic. In 1963 The Reshaping of British Railways report recommended that BR close both the branch line to Banbury and the Great Central Main Line. It closed Finmere station and the Banbury branch line immediately, and the Great Central Main Line in 1966.

References

Sources

External links

Civil parishes in Oxfordshire
Villages in Oxfordshire